Arthur Smith (7 June 1908 – 6 September 1987) was an Australian rules footballer who played for the Footscray Football Club and North Melbourne Football Club in the Victorian Football League (VFL).

Notes

External links 
		

1908 births
1987 deaths
Australian rules footballers from Victoria (Australia)
Western Bulldogs players
North Melbourne Football Club players